Abalo is a Spanish surname. Notable people with the surname include:

 Améleté Abalo (1962–2010), Togolese football coach
 Jean-Paul Abalo (born 1975), Togolese football player
 Luc Abalo (born 1984), French handball player
 Manuel Jiménez Abalo (born 1956), Spanish football player

See also 
 Abalos

Spanish-language surnames